The Huawei Ascend G600 is an Android smartphone made by Huawei. It was released in 2012 during August.

Models 
The phone comes in the following 4 different models, all supported by the Google Play Store:
 HUAWEI U8950N-1
 HUAWEI U8950N-51
 HUAWEI U8950-1
 HUAWEI U8950D

The first letter of each model is the network: U = UMTS (WCDMA) and C = CDMA. The last D stands for Dual Sim feature.
Note that the U8950 G600 sold outside China, is single sim. C8950D is the CDMA dual sim version.

The HUAWEI U8950N-1 & HUAWEI U8950N-51 appear to be American / Australian models, while the HUAWEI U8950D is the Chinese model.

Specifications 

Though the phone would be classed as 'mid range', its hardware and features allow it to fall into the upper range of mid range phones. So essentially, it just borderlines high range.

For full, in depth specifications, visit the following link: http://www.gsmarena.com/huawei_ascend_g600-4963.php

Summary of phone specs 

 2G/3G Support
 NFC
 540 x 960 4.5 inch screen
 4GB Internal Storage
 768 MB RAM
 Qualcomm Snapdragon S4 Play (MSM8225) dual core 1.2 GHz ARM Cortex-A5 processor
 MicroSD support up to 32GB
 Android ICS 4.0.4
 8MP Camera with high quality VGA video recording
 Secondary 0.3 MP Camera
 HTML 5 Support
 1930 mAh battery, providing up to 360 hours of stand-by time and roughly 8 hours of talk time.

Rooting and Unlocking Bootloader
'csfrank271' published an in-depth article on XDA developers about unlocking the bootloader and gaining root access.
The rooting method, though only supposed to work for the U8950D, works perfectly fine on the U8950N-51 model too.
The article can be found here:

http://forum.xda-developers.com/showthread.php?p=36251172#post36251172

References

 http://forum.xda-developers.com/showthread.php?t=1943003&page=27
 http://www.gsmarena.com/huawei_ascend_g600-4963.php

G600
Android (operating system) devices
Mobile phones introduced in 2012
Discontinued smartphones